Sphingomonas asaccharolytica  is a bacterium from the genus of Sphingomonas which has been isolated from roots from an apple tree in Japan.

References

Further reading

External links
Type strain of Sphingomonas asaccharolytica at BacDive -  the Bacterial Diversity Metadatabase

asaccharolytica
Bacteria described in 1995